Cephonodes lifuensis is a moth of the  family Sphingidae. It is known from New Caledonia.

References

Cephonodes
Moths described in 1894